Refractory period is a period immediately following a stimulus during which further stimulation has no effect. It may specifically refer to:

 Refractory period (physiology), recovery time of an excitable membrane to be ready for a second stimulus once it returns to its resting state, following excitation in the areas of biology, physiology and cardiology
 Refractory period (sex), the recovery phase after orgasm during which it is physiologically impossible for an individual to have additional orgasms
 Psychological refractory period, the delay in response to the second of two closely spaced psychological stimuli
 Postictal state, the period following a series of epileptic seizures during which seizures cannot be induced

See also
 Refractory (disambiguation)

bg:Рефрактерен период
de:Refraktärphase (Sexualität)
lt:Refrakcinis laikotarpis
nl:Refractaire periode
ru:Рефрактерный период